Jess Osuna (May 28, 1928 – April 2, 2011) was an American character actor whose credits included Three Days of the Condor and My Old Man.

Osuna had a successful film, television and stage career, including the films A New Leaf, Three Days of the Condor, All the President's Men, Taps and Kramer vs. Kramer, and the television shows Columbo, Kojak, NYPD and Hawk.

He had extensive theatre credits as well, and his Broadway credits include Happy Birthday Wanda June, Edison Theatre, 1970–1971, An Almost Perfect Person, The Belasco Theatre, 1977–1978, and The Goodbye People by Herb Gardner, at The Ethel Barrymore Theatre, 1968. He also starred in the Berkshire Theatre Festival's 1968 premiere production of A Cry of Players as Gilbert. He was first a student, then an instructor and performer at HB Studios in Greenwich Village, New York City. He studied with both Herbert Berghoff and Uta Hagen and eventually taught his own classes. For the last 7 years or so of his life he studied with Austin Pendleton, at HB, and performed with the HB Ensemble. Perhaps his favorite role was the title role in Hamlet which he played with the HB Ensemble. He rode his bicycle to appointments, classes and performances all over the city well into his 80s. Osuna died at his home in Greenwich Village, Manhattan, on April 2, 2011, at the age of 82. He was predeceased by his wife, Mary Anne. He is survived by his daughter Tracy and his grandson, Sean, as well as many nieces and nephews. Osuna was buried at Calvary Cemetery in Woodside, Queens.

Filmography

References

External links

1928 births
2011 deaths
American male film actors
American male television actors
People from Greenwich Village
Burials at Calvary Cemetery (Queens)